Wadi Seidna Air Base  is a military airport  north of Khartoum in Sudan. 

The air base's history goes back to World War II. The U.S. Army Air Forces' 46th Ferrying Squadron, Air Transport Command, was activated at the base on 2 December 1942. The squadron was assigned to the 13th Ferrying Group which was responsible for a region spanning El Geneine, Anglo-Egyptian Sudan, now in West Darfur, to Karachi, India (now Pakistan), and from Cairo, Egypt, to Tehran, Iran. The squadron was responsible for the aerial transportation of personnel, supplies and mail throughout this area.

Two sources give different details about the stay of No. 114 Maintenance Unit RAF at Wadi Seidna. National Archives say that No. 114 Maintenance Unit was formed at Wadi Seidna in April 1942 but then disbanded in February 1943. 
RAFweb indicates 114 MU was located at Wadi Seidna between 26 December 1941 and 20 February 1943.

On 7 May 1944, No 115 (Transport) Wing RAF was established at the station by redesignating No 2 (Middle East) Ferry Control within No. 216 Group RAF.

By 1946 the field was no longer in use.  

The base now hosts elements of the Sudanese Air Force.

See also

Transport in Sudan
List of airports in Sudan

References

External links
 OurAirports - Sudan
OpenStreetMap - Wadi Seidna AB

Airports in Sudan
Sudanese Air Force
Military airbases